Aleksandr Kozlov (born 5 January 1952) is a retired male hammer thrower, who represented the Soviet Union during his career. He set his personal best (78.58 metres) on 24 May 1980 at a meet in Adler, Soviet Union. His was the bronze medalist from the 1977 World Student Games.

Achievements

References
 Year Ranking

1952 births
Living people
Soviet male hammer throwers
Russian male hammer throwers
Universiade medalists in athletics (track and field)
Universiade bronze medalists for the Soviet Union
Medalists at the 1977 Summer Universiade